The Minister of Social Solidarity and Inclusion is a senior member of the Constitutional Government of East Timor heading the Ministry of Social Solidarity and Inclusion.

Functions
Under the Constitution of East Timor, the Minister has the power and the duty:

Where the Minister is in charge of the subject matter of a government statute, the Minister is also required, together with the Prime Minister, to sign the statute.

Incumbent
The incumbent Minister of Social Solidarity and Inclusion is Armanda Berta dos Santos, Deputy Prime Minister 
 of East Timor.

List of Ministers 
The following individuals have been appointed as the Minister:

References

Footnote

Notes

External links
  – official site

Social Solidarity and Inclusion